NA-76 Gujranwala-III is a constituency for the National Assembly of Pakistan.

Members of Parliament

2018-2022: NA-83 Gujranwala-V

Election 2002 

General elections were held on 10 Oct 2002. Rana Umar Nazir Khan of PML-Q won by 62,209 votes.

Election 2008 

General elections were held on 18 Feb 2008. Rana Nazeer Ahmed Khan of PML-N won by 60,219 votes.

Election 2013 

General elections were held on 11 May 2013. Rana Umar Nazir Khan of PML-N won by 97,143 votes and became the  member of National Assembly.

Election 2018 
General elections were held on 25 July 2018.

See also
NA-75 Gujranwala-II
NA-77 Gujranwala-IV

References

External links
 Election result's official website

NA-099